"Mom Always Liked You Best!" is the eighth comedy album by the Smothers Brothers (released August 17, 1965 on Mercury Records).  It reached number 39 on the Billboard Pop Albums chart. The album was recorded at The Troubadour, Los Angeles, California, The Golden Bear, Huntington Beach, California, and the Flamingo Hotel, Las Vegas, Nevada.  

The cover photograph shows Dick surrounded by a dog, a wagon, a scooter and many other toys while Tom is sitting there with just his chicken, Frank, thereby justifying the title as a word balloon.  The album is dedicated to the Smothers Brothers' producer David Carroll and the comments on the back were written by Jack Benny.

Track listing
"Mom Always Liked You Best" (4:43) - Tom and Dick fight.
"Impersonation" (1:17)
"The Three Song" (2:44) - Written for the two of them by Mason Williams.
"Little Known Song and Dance" (3:22) - "Songs about diseases" (The Scurvy Song)
"The World I Used To Know" (3:29) - by Rod McKuen
"My Favorite Holiday" (0:58)
"You Can Call Me Stupid" (2:43) - Continues the fight from the first track.
"We Love Us" (2:26) - Tom recites a love poem he's written.
"Longtime Blues" (3:18) - Another Mason Williams song.
"Tattoo Song" (3:44) 
"Santa Claus" (0:36) -  Tom's version of "Santa Claus is Coming to Town" ends rather ironically.
"The Last Great Waltz" (4:11) - A song about Jonathan W. Astor who meets the perfect waltz partner.
"Reminiscences" (2:33) - Tom reminisces about Dick's wedding, with Tom loudly claiming that  Dick had refused to let him be the 'Best Man.'  What may have been the largest recorded laugh the duo ever provoked came in this track.  Tom said that, after the wedding, everyone went upstairs to the "Conception."  Dick states, over the large laughter, that it was a nice, normal "Reception."  Tom then finished off the audience by sheepishly saying, "I must have been in the wrong room."  (Based on an actual incident involving a little girl at a wedding Tom attended.)

Personnel
Dick Smothers – vocals, double bass
Tom Smothers – vocals, guitar
Mason Williams - Accompanist

Chart positions

External links
Complete  Smothers Brothers' discography can be found here.

Smothers Brothers albums
1965 live albums
Mercury Records live albums